Parhippolyte is a genus of cave dwelling decapod crustaceans, known as cave shrimps from the family Barbouriidae The type species Parhipplyte uvea was described in 1900 by the English carcinologist Lancelot Alexander Borradaile from specimens collected in the south western Pacific by Arthur Willey. As their vernacular name of cave shrimp suggests these species are generally found in marine caves as well as anchialine ponds and lagoons.

Species
There are currently 5 species recognised:

 Parhippolyte cavernicola Wicksten, 1996 — Gulf of California
 Parhippolyte misticia (J. Clark, 1989) — Palau
 Parhippolyte rukuensis Burukovsky, 2007 — Ryukyu Islands
 Parhippolyte sterreri (C.W.J. Hart & Manning, 1981) — Caribbean and Bermuda
 Parhippolyte uveae Borradaile, 1900 — Indian and western Pacific Oceans

References

Alpheoidea
Cave shrimp
Decapod genera